ALSAT-1 is the first Algerian satellite and it is part of a group of satellites collectively known as the Disaster Monitoring Constellation (DMC). The satellite was built by a group of engineers from Surrey Satellite Technology (SSTL) and Algerian Centre National des Techniques Spatiales (CNTS). It was the first DMC satellite to be launched of the five to seven that are planned. The DMC was the first satellite constellation designed for that objective. The launch took place on 28 November 2002 from the Plesetsk Cosmodrome in northern Russia on a Kosmos-3M launcher in -20 degree Celsius weather. It completed its mission after seven years and nine months in August 2010. The satellite was designed to operate for five years.

AlSat-1 is built on the SSTL-100 platform. The onboard instrumentation consists of two banks with three Earth imaging cameras each that, in total, has a resolution of 32 meters in three spectral bands (NIR, red, and green). The imaging swath of the cameras is 600 km. The satellite was constructed in a fifteen-month time period by the British and Algerians, of which eleven Algerian engineers were trained by SSTL. The satellite uses resistojets for propulsion, and butane as its propellant. The resistojets provide more than 20 m/s of delta velocity.

Operations 

This satellite carried the first Slim 6 Line Imager. The imaging opportunities for Algeria is one per day, for two or three days out of five days. During the first three months of operations, more than 80 images were transmitted back to Earth.

See also

Algeria national space programs

References

External links
 AlSAT-1 Info
 Algerian Space Agency information on Alsat-1

Spacecraft launched in 2002
Earth imaging satellites
Satellites of Algeria
First artificial satellites of a country